Graptopetalum bartramii is a species of succulent plant known as Bartram's stonecrop and Patagonia Mountain leatherpetal.

It is endemic to Arizona, in the Patagonia Mountains in Santa Cruz County and within the Coronado National Forest.

It is being evaluated by the United States Fish and Wildlife Service for inclusion on the list of endangered or threatened species under the Endangered Species Act of 1973.

References

bartramii
Endemic flora of the United States
Flora of Arizona
~
Santa Cruz County, Arizona
Plants described in 1926
Endangered flora of the United States